Vicente Amigo Girol (born 25 March 1967) is a Spanish flamenco composer and guitarist, born in Guadalcanal near Seville. He has played as an accompanying guitarist on recordings by flamenco singers Camarón de la Isla, and Luis de Córdoba, and he has acted as a producer for Remedios Amaya and José Mercé. His album Ciudad de las Ideas won the 2001 Latin Grammy for the Best Flamenco Album and the 2002 Ondas award for the best Flamenco work.

Biography 
Amigo was raised in Córdoba, where he took guitar lessons and later improved his playing with Manolo Sanlúcar, with whom he worked for ten years. After a period of accompaniment which began with El Pele, he devoted himself almost exclusively to playing concerts in 1988. De Mi Corazón al Aire (From Out of My Heart, 1991) was his first solo record. An admirer of Paco de Lucía since childhood, Amigo took part with him in the show Leyendas de la guitarra (Legends of the Guitar) in Seville.

Amigo has worked with Amaia Montero, Khaled, Miguel Bosé, Carmen Linares, Manolo Sanlúcar, Wagner Tiso, Rosario, Nacho Cano, Alejandro Sanz, Sting, Paco de Lucía, Stanley Jordan, John McLaughlin, Al Di Meola, and Milton Nascimento.

Discography

As leader
 De mi corazón al aire (CBS/Sony, 1991)
 Vivencias Imaginadas (CBS/Sony, 1995)
 Poeta (CBS/Sony, 1997)
  Del Amanecer... with Jose Merce (Virgin, 1998)
 Ciudad de las Ideas (2000)
 Un Momento en el Sonido (Columbia, 2005)
 Paseo de Gracia (Sony, 2009)
 Tierra (Sony, 2013)
 Memoria de los Sentidos (Sony, 2017)

As sideman
With Miguel Bosé
 Bajo El Signo De Cain (WEA, 1993)
 Laberinto (WEA, 1995)
 Mordre Dans Ton Coeur (WEA, 1997)
 Papitwo (WEA, 2012)

With others
 Remedios Amaya, Me Voy Contigo (Hispavox, EMI 1997)
 Pedro Aznar, Mudras: Canciones De a Dos (Tabriz Music, 2003)
 David Bisbal, Premonicion (Vale Music, 2006)
 Nacho Cano, The Feminine Side (Virgin, 1997)
 Nacho Cano, A un Musical De (Warner, 2008)
 Los Chunguitos, Vive a Tu Manera en Directo (EMI, 1988)
 Camarón de la Isla, Soy Gitano (El Pais, 2010)
 Tino di Geraldo, Burlerias (Nuevos Medios, 1994)
 Roberto Fonseca, Zamazu (Enja, 2007)
 GNR, Sob Escuta (EMI, 1994)
 Josh Groban, Bridges (Reprise, 2018)
 Alberto Iglesias, Hable Con Ella (Milan, 2002)
 Azucar Moreno, Ojos Negros (Epic, 1992)
 Enrique Morente & Lagartija Nick, Omega (El Europeo Musica, 1996)
 Carlos Nunez, Os Amores Libres (RCA Victor, 1999)
 Potito, Andando por Los Caminos (CBS, 1990)
 Manolo Sanlucar, Tauromagia (Polydor, 1988)
 Alejandro Sanz, El Alma al Aire (WEA, 2001)
 Alejandro Sanz, Mas (WEA, 2006)
 Sting, Sacred Love (A&M, 2003)
 Wagner Tiso, Baobab (Philips, 1990)
 Wagner Tiso, Brazilian Scenes (Kardum/Iris, 1997)
 Potito, Mi reencuentro (Concert Music Entertainment S.L, 2018)
 El Pele, Canto (BMG Music Spain S.A, 2003)

References

1967 births
Spanish flamenco guitarists
Spanish male guitarists
Musicians from Andalusia
Sony Music Spain artists
Latin Grammy Award winners
Living people
Spanish composers
Spanish male composers
People from Sierra Norte (Seville)